The House of Snails is a 2021 psychological thriller film with rural horror and fantasy elements directed by  from a screenplay by Sandra García Nieto based on García Nieto's novel La casa del caracol which stars Javier Rey alongside Paz Vega and Carlos Alcántara.

Plot 
The plot is set in the 1970s in a fictional village ("Quintanar") in the Andalusian sierra, where Antonio Prieto, a writer addicted to mezcal rents a house there so he can write his novel in relative isolation. The mysterious folks and the village are connected to superstitions and rumours about a strange and frightening creature known as El Vímero.

Cast

Production 
Written by Sandra García Nieto, the screenplay is an adaptation of her own novel of the same name. Described by Macarena Astorga as "a thriller that mixes a bit of psychological horror, suspense, mystery and fantasy", The House of Snails is the director's debut feature film. A joint Spanish-Peruvian-Mexican co-production, it was produced by Esto también pasará and Casita Colorá Producciones AIE alongside Bowfinger International Pictures, Basque Films, Producciones Tondero and Hippo Entertainment Group, with the participation of RTVE, Canal Sur, and Amazon Prime Video.

Release 
The film was presented in the official selection of the 24th Málaga Film Festival on 7 June 2021. Distributed by Filmax, it was theatrically released in Spain on 11 June 2021.

Reception 
Beatriz Martínez of El Periódico de Catalunya rated the film 1 out of 5 stars, writing that "none of the elements of this film make any sense", and the film ends up becoming "an incompetent and arbitrary thriller" attempt.

Irene Crespo of Cinemanía rated the film 3 out of 5 stars underscoring as a veredict the film to be "[an] intense psychological thriller. Magical and rural realism".

Raquel Hernández Luján of HobbyConsolas rated the film with 50 points ("so-so") positively citing the good main actors and the well-done cinematography, whilst negatively assessing the "very poorly directed" secondary actors and the film's overly "abrupt and gimmicky" denouement, otherwise pointing out at the result being a "quite unsatisfactory" film overall.

Elsa Fernández-Santos of El País considered that, despite early managing to unsettle the viewer with the atmosphere and setting, Macarena Astorga "gets totally lost when the secondary characters end up reduced to nothing and the main character leaves the viewer, to say the least, perplexed".

Accolades 

|-
| rowspan = "4" align = "center" | 2022 || rowspan = "3" | 1st Carmen Awards || Best Actress || Paz Vega ||  || rowspan = "3" | 
|-
| Best New Director || Macarena Astorga || 
|-
| Best Sound || Diana Sagrista || 
|-
| 30th Actors and Actresses Union Awards || Best Film Actor in a Minor Role || Fernando Tejero ||  || align = "center" | 
|}

See also 
 List of Spanish films of 2021

References 

2021 psychological thriller films
Films set in the 1970s
Films set in Andalusia
Films about writers
Spanish psychological thriller films
Peruvian psychological thriller films
2020s Spanish films
Films based on Spanish novels
2020s Peruvian films
2020s Spanish-language films
Tondero Producciones films
Bowfinger International Pictures films
2021 directorial debut films
Films shot in the province of Málaga